Sector 9 is a skateboard manufacturer and subsidiary of Bravo Sports.  The company was started in La Jolla, California in 1993 by cofounders Steve Lake, Dave Klimkiewicz, Dennis Telfer, and Tal O'Farrell. Sector 9 is currently headquartered in San Diego, California.

Sector 9 manufactures skateboarding equipment and surf/skate lifestyle apparel. Their main focus is on hard goods, but they also offer a range of soft goods. Throughout their history, they have catered to both entry level skaters with more cruiser oriented boards, as well as high performance downhill skateboarding goods, that have been used by professional riders. 
 
Billabong International acquired Sector 9 in 2008. On June 28, 2016, it was announced that Bravo Corp had in turn purchased the company from Billabong for $12 million.

Sector 9 sponsors numerous different athletes in skateboarding and surfing, including Joel Tudor and Levi Hawken of Nek Minnit fame.

References

External links

Sector 9 Punta Lobos Review
Sector 9 Longboards - Skateboarding.com.au
Sector 9 Longboards - experience for high quality 

Manufacturing companies based in San Diego
Companies established in 1993
Sporting goods manufacturers of the United States
Skateboarding companies